Amandinea maritima is a species of corticolous (bark-dwelling), crustose lichen in the family Caliciaceae. Found in Europe, it was described as new to science in 2011.

References

maritima
Lichen species
Lichens described in 2011
Lichens of Europe
Taxa named by John Alan Elix